Lionair, Inc., operated as Lionair, was a charter airline and a general aviation company that operated in the Philippines with base operation in Pasay. It operated charter passenger using fixed-wing and rotary-winged aircraft.

History
On August 2, 2011, the Philippine Senate conducted a hearing on the alleged involvement of the company in the sale to the Philippine National Police of used helicopters that were described as brand new.

The Civil Aviation Authority of the Philippines (CAAP) had grounded Lionair in late March 2020 after a second fatal crash in just over six months.

Fleet
 Cessna Citation 500
 IAI Westwind I
 IAI Westwind II
 Beechcraft B200 King Air
 Let L-410 UPV
 Robinson R44

Accidents and incidents
On September 1, 2019, a Beechcraft Super King Air 350 on a medevac mission from Dipolog crashed into a resort in Calamba, Laguna, due to engine failure. The aircraft, registered as RP-C2296 was written off. All nine passengers on board died.
On March 29, 2020, a Lionair IAI Westwind plane registered as RP-C5880 caught fire and exploded while taking off from Ninoy Aquino International Airport in Manila killing all eight people on board. The aircraft was on a medevac mission to Tokyo, Japan.

References

Defunct airlines of the Philippines
Airlines established in 2011
Airlines disestablished in 2020
Defunct charter airlines
Companies based in Pasay
Philippine companies established in 2011
2020 disestablishments in the Philippines